Iina Kuustonen (born 18 April 1984 in Helsinki) is a Finnish actress.

Kuustonen is most famous for her appearances in the Finnish television series Putous (2011–2014), Helsingin herra (2012) and Syke (2014). She has also played in several movies, including The Kiss of Evil (2011) and FC Venus (2005). She won the Kultainen Venla, "Golden Venla" award for best actress for her roles in Helsingin Herra and Putous in 2012.

Life and career 
Kuustonen studied in Helsinki theatre academy, where she graduated with a master's degree in acting in 2011.

Kuustonen has done a lot of work in theatres, and for example performed as the second lead Pirkko Mannola in the musical Pirkko & Åke at the summer theatre of Valkeakoski in summer 2010. She has also performed in Ronia, the Robber's Daughter at Suomenlinna summer theatre in 2011, and in Espoo city theater's musical Kojoottikuu in 2014.

She has also done a lot of Finnish dubs to different movies like Kung Fu Panda (2008), How to Train Your Dragon (2010) and The Croods (2013), just to name a few.

Finnish musician Mikko Kuustonen is Iina Kuustonen's father. Iina's sister Minka Kuustonen is also an actress.

Kuustonen was engaged to Sebastian Rejman but in June 2022 the couple announced that they have separated. Together they have a son born in September 2016 and a daughter born in February 2019.

Filmography

References

External links
 
 Iina Kuustonen on actorsinscandinavia.com

1984 births
Living people
Actresses from Helsinki
Finnish television actresses
Finnish film actresses